Red Rock Peak is a peak rising to 2,000 m about 1 nautical mile (1.9 km) north-northwest of Thomson Peak in the south part of Mirabito Range, Victoria Land. The name is descriptive of the rock at the peak and was given by Bradley Field, geologist, New Zealand Geological Survey, a member of a New Zealand Antarctic Research Program (NZARP) geological party to the area, 1980–81.

References

Mountains of Victoria Land
Pennell Coast